Negrași is a commune in Argeș County, Muntenia, Romania. It is composed of four villages: Bârlogu, Buta, Mozacu and Negrași.

Near Negrași is situated Poiana cu Narcise Negrași (Negrași Daffodil Meadow), a natural reservation.

References

Communes in Argeș County
Localities in Muntenia